The 1891 All-Ireland Senior Football Championship Final was the fourth All-Ireland Final and the culmination of the 1891 All-Ireland Senior Football Championship, an inter-county Gaelic football tournament for the top teams in Ireland. Dublin were the winners.

It was the first of six All-Ireland football titles won by Dublin in the 1890s.

According to the website of the beaten finalists Clondrohid GAA (counties were represented by their club champions at that time), "Clondrohid had now qualified for the All Ireland Senior Football Final against Young Irelands of Dublin played on 28th February 1892 in Clonturk Park in Dublin. Clondrohid won the game 2-9 to 2-1, but several hours after the game the referee disallowed the first Clondrohid goal and as at the time a goal outweighed any number of points, Young Irelands were deemed victorious. Clondrohid subsequently appealed the decision and a replay was granted but for different reasons was never played and Dublin entered the record books as winners of the All Ireland Football title of 1891."

References

football
All-Ireland Senior Football Championship Finals
Cork county football team matches
Dublin county football team matches